Willard Newman Hirsch  (1905–1982) was an American sculptor.

Life
He studied at the College of Charleston, and the Beaux-Arts Institute of Design.
He exhibited at the National Academy of Design.
He taught at the College of Charleston, the Gibbes Museum of Art School and the Charleston Art School (1953–1964) with William Melton Halsey and Corrie McCallum. 
He had a studio at 2 Queen Street.

His work is held by Brookgreen Gardens, Newberry College, Charleston County Library, Clemson House.

His papers are held at the College of Charleston.

References

External links
Willard Newman Hirsch at Ask Art
Willard Hirsch at the Charleston Renaissance Gallery

1905 births
1982 deaths
Artists from Charleston, South Carolina
20th-century American sculptors
20th-century American male artists
American male sculptors
Sculptors from South Carolina